Fateme Sadeghi Dastak  (born 19 October 1999) is an Iranian karate athlete. She won the silver medal in the women's individual kata event at the 2019 World Beach Games held in Doha, Qatar. She won the silver medal in the women's individual kata event at the 2021 Islamic Solidarity Games held in Konya, Turkey.

At the 2019 Asian Karate Championships held in Tashkent, Uzbekistan, she won one of the bronze medals in the women's individual kata event.

In 2021, she competed at the World Olympic Qualification Tournament held in Paris, France hoping to qualify for the 2020 Summer Olympics in Tokyo, Japan.

She won one of the bronze medals in her event at the 2022 Asian Karate Championships held in Tashkent, Uzbekistan.

Achievements

References

External links 
 

Living people
1999 births
Place of birth missing (living people)
Iranian female karateka
Islamic Solidarity Games medalists in karate
Islamic Solidarity Games competitors for Iran
21st-century Iranian women